Hemisphaerota cyanea, known generally as palmetto tortoise beetle, is a species of leaf beetle in the family Chrysomelidae. Other names include the Florida tortoise beetle and iridescent blue chrysomelid beetle. It is native to the southeastern United States, from North Carolina, south to Florida, and west to Mississippi. It is introduced to southern Texas.

The palmetto tortoise beetle was originally described in 1824 by Thomas Say as Imatidium cyaneum. The specific name (cyanea) means "dark blue".

Description
The palmetto tortoise beetle is a small beetle growing  in length. The coloring of the elytra and pronotum is a dark, metallic blue. The orange antennae are short and enlarged at the tips. 

Larva of the palmetto tortoise beetle hide under a nest-like covering of thin strands of frass (fecal matter). They pupate inside of these fecal shelters. The adults hold themselves on fronds of palmettos with thousands of microscopic bristles on their tarsi ("feet"), paired with an oil that makes them difficult to pry off the leaves.

Ecology
Both the larva and adults of Hemisphaerota cyanea feed on palmetto plants (Sabal species).

References

External links

 

Cassidinae
Articles created by Qbugbot
Beetles described in 1824